Mexico–Spain relations are the bilateral relations between Mexico and Spain. Both nations are members of the Organisation for Economic Co-operation and Development, Organization of Ibero-American States and the United Nations.

History

Spanish conquest

The Spanish conquistador Hernán Cortés led an expedition to what is now Mexico in 1518, establishing the city of Veracruz on his arrival. Tenochtitlan, the capital of the Aztec Empire, fell to Spain in 1521. It was renamed Mexico City, the capital of the Viceroyalty of New Spain. The Viceroyalty had a stratified social hierarchy based on race with the peninsulares (people born in Spain) on top, who had the most civil rights, until the Laws of the Indies were established throughout the Spanish Empire in the Americas.

Independence
 

The late 18th and early 19th century saw much revolutionary feeling in the countries of Western Europe and their colonies. The feeling built up in Mexico after the occupation of Spain by the French Revolutionary Emperor Napoleon in 1808, and the 1810 Grito de Dolores speech by Mexican Catholic priest Miguel Hidalgo y Costilla against Spanish rule is widely recognized as the beginning of the Mexican War of Independence. In 1811, Hidalgo was executed by the Spanish militia, but his movement fought on until the establishment of the independent constitutional Mexican Empire in 1821, after the Treaty of Córdoba. The Empire was ousted and the first Mexican Republic created in 1823.

Post-independence

Spain established diplomatic relations with Mexico on 26 December 1836 (15 years after Mexico had declared its independence). In the beginning, the diplomatic relationship between the two nations was strained due to Mexico having been a former colony of Spain and the latter's unsuccessful endeavors to reconquer its former colony in the ensuing years under General Isidro Barradas.

General Juan Prim commanded the Spanish expeditionary army in Mexico in 1862, when France, Spain, and the United Kingdom sought forced payment from the liberal government of Benito Juárez for loans. Prim was a sympathizer with the Mexican liberal cause, thus he refused to consent to the ambitious schemes of French emperor Napoleon III, and withdrew Spanish forces following a meeting with Manuel Doblado.

During the Spanish Civil War (1936–1939), Mexico had provided arms and refuge to political refugees. Throughout the war, Mexican volunteers joined the Republican side to fight Francisco Franco. In 1939 when Francisco Franco took power in Spain, Mexico severed diplomatic relations between the two nations. After the war, thousands of Spanish refugees sought asylum in Mexico and former Mexican consul in Marseille, France, Gilberto Bosques Saldívar, issued thousands of visas to Spanish refugees and other asylees to seek refuge in Mexico. Though the Republicans had lost the war, this helped improve the relationship between the two countries after the death of Franco. Mexico and Spain re-established diplomatic relations on 28 March 1977.

Since re-establishing diplomatic relations, both nations share close and warm diplomatic relations. On several occasions, both countries had supported each other diplomatically and there have been several high level visits and meetings between both governments including with the Spanish Royal Family. Soon after re-establishing diplomatic relations 1977; Spanish Prime Minister Adolfo Suárez paid an official visit to Mexico, the first ever by a Spanish head of government. That same year, in October 1977, Mexican President José López Portillo paid an official visit to Spain.

Relations in the 21st century
Several Latin American countries, including Mexico, have been accused of harboring members of the armed organization ETA.

On September 19, 2017, Mexico suffered an earthquake of 7.1 degrees that seriously affected different areas of the country, including its capital, Mexico City, where several buildings collapsed. The following day, the Military Emergencies Unit (UME) began the progressive deployment of an Urban Search and Rescue (USAR) team with health support, communications and logistics capabilities. A total of 54 soldiers, two of them from the Army, who flew to Mexico in an Air Force Airbus in response to a bilateral request from the Government of that country. Coordinated by the Centralized Command for the Management of International Teams, the UME USAR team collaborated with the country's emergency services to rescue the greatest number of people alive and recover the dead bodies that could be trapped in the rubble.

In 2019, Mexican President Andrés Manuel López Obrador classified foreign investment in Mexico as "neocolonialist" and linked Spanish and U.S. companies without evidence, the same political situation that occurred in other Latin American countries such as Argentina or Bolivia. In January, the President of the Spanish Government, Pedro Sánchez, made an official visit to Mexico and met with the Mexican president. Both leaders commemorated eighty years since the end of the Spanish civil war and recognized Mexico's openness to receive thousands of Spanish refugees who fled their homes and found asylum in Mexico and their contribution to their adopted country. However, In March, the Mexican Government demanded a public apology from Spain for the conquest of Mexico, which was firmly rejected, both by the Spanish Government and the Spanish Crown as well as by the National Indigenous Congress (CNI) of Mexico through its spokeswoman, María de Jesús Patricio Martínez. In addition, 62% of the Mexican population believes that López Obrador used the conquest to do politics, while more than half of Mexicans (55%) do not consider an apology necessary for colonization. In fact, the descendants of the Aztec emperor Moctezuma II, such as Juan José Marcilla de Teruel-Moctezuma y Valcárcel (current holder of the Dukedom of Moctezuma de Tultengo), criticized the Mexican president, considering that there is no point in apologizing for something that happened five centuries ago, and that they do not want their ancestors to be used for political purposes.

In November 2020, Spanish Foreign Minister Arancha González Laya paid a visit to Mexico. In April 2021, the visit was reciprocated by Mexican Foreign Minister Marcelo Ebrard when he paid a visit to Spain. During his visit, Ebrard announced that Mexico will participate in Phase 3 of the Spanish project for a vaccine against COVID-19. In addition, Ebrard announced that Spain made the decision to share vaccines with other countries in Latin America and the Caribbean.

In February 2022, Mexican president López Obrador proposed a "pause" in the bilateral relations between both countries, in light of alleged mispractices of Spanish companies in Mexico during previous administrations. The Spanish Government issued a notice categorically rejecting the offences against Spain and Spanish companies, arguing that both countries are "strategic partners" while noting that the Spanish government wishes for "relations based on mutual respect".

In March 2022, the Spanish Foreign Minister José Manuel Albares traveled to Mexico and together with the Mexican Foreign Minister, Marcelo Ebrard, both countries have agreed to “accelerate the relationship” between the two countries instead of taking a pause as requested in February 2022 by President López Obrador. During the meeting, the two foreign ministers signed four agreements on political, cultural, scientific and cooperation in the rights of women.

High-level visits

Presidential visits from Mexico to Spain

 President José López Portillo (1977)
 President Miguel de la Madrid Hurtado (1985)
 President Carlos Salinas de Gortari (1992)
 President Ernesto Zedillo (1996, 2000)
 President Vicente Fox (2001, 2002, 2005, 2006)
 President Felipe Calderón (2007, 2008, 2010, 2012)
 President Enrique Peña Nieto (2014, 2018)

Royal and Prime Ministerial visits from Spain to Mexico

 Prime Minister Adolfo Suárez (1977)
 King Juan Carlos I of Spain (1978, 1990, 1991, 1993, 1997, 2002)
 Queen Sofía of Spain (1983, 1985, 2000)
 Prime Minister Felipe González (1985, 1987, 1991)
 King (and as Prince) Felipe VI of Spain (1991, 2000, 2004, 2006, 2008, 2012, 2014, 2015, 2018)
 Prime Minister José María Aznar (1996, 2001, 2002, 2003)
 Prime Minister José Luis Rodríguez Zapatero (2004, 2007)
 Prime Minister Mariano Rajoy Brey (April and June 2012, 2014)
 Queen Letizia of Spain (2017)
 Prime Minister Pedro Sánchez (2019)

Bilateral agreements
Over the years, both nations have signed numerous bilateral agreements and treaties such as an Agreement on Scientific and Technical Cooperation (1977); Agreement on the elimination of visas (1977); Agreement on Cultural and Educational Cooperation (1978); Agreement on Nuclear Energy Cooperation for peaceful purposes (1979); Air Transportation Agreement (1979); Agreement on Economic and Commercial Cooperation (1980); Extradition Treaty (1984); Agreement on the Avoidance of Double-Taxation (1984); Tourism Agreement (1996); Agreement on the Promotion and Protection of Investments (1997); Agreement on Cooperation between the Bank of Mexico and Bank of Spain (2014) and an Agreement on Cooperation against Organized Crime (2014).

Transport
There are direct flights between Mexico and Spain through the following airlines: Aeroméxico, Air Europa, Evelop Airlines, Iberia and Wamos Air.

Cultural cooperation
Both nations have established cultural centers in their respective capitals in order to promote the development of both Mexico and Spain, through greater knowledge of both nations in cultural, business, entrepreneurship, tourism, gastronomic, and community development issues.

In May 2022, the Mexican Congress installed a friendship group with Spain. The president of the group, deputy Anuar Roberto Azuar of the PAN, described as "necessary and timely" the meeting with the Spanish ambassador, Juan López-Doriga Pérez, who went to the Lower House of Congress to sign the agreement. In the same month, within the framework of the celebration of the 45th anniversary of the reestablishment of relations between the two countries, Mexico reinforced cultural promotion and academic cooperation with Spain. In addition, in October, the Undersecretary of Foreign Affairs of Mexico, Carmen Moreno Toscano, made a working visit to Spain with the aim of expanding the "key" political dialogue between the two countries and stressed that the bilateral relationship is "broad, solid and dynamic, for the bonds of friendship and the desire for cooperation between the two countries”, and "which is extremely rich, not only because of our common history and culture, but also because of our commercial and human exchanges".

Since May 2022, the Mexican archaeologist responsible for the excavation of Tenochtitlan, Eduardo Matos Moctezuma, was distinguished with the Princess of Asturias Award for Social Sciences and argued that both countries should further strengthen their relations. Likewise, in October, he stated that "Spain and Mexico are linked by indissoluble ties" and that "they must move towards a promising future".

Since June 2022, the Group of World Heritage Cities of Spain and the National Association of Mexican World Heritage Cities have agreed to strengthen their relations with the aim of promoting mutual cooperation and the exchange of information, experiences and good practices in matters related to the defense of heritage, culture, and tourism promotion. This agreement has been reflected in the signing of a letter of intent signed by the president of the Group of World Heritage Cities of Spain, Carlos García Carbayo, and the president of the Mexican association, Loredana Montes, after holding a meeting that they have kept in the headquarters of the Historic Center Trust of Mexico City. 

Mariachi and flamenco are two genres of Latin music, recognized as intangible cultural heritage, being emblems of Mexican and Spanish culture respectively. Likewise, they have become popular among the societies of both countries with the exchange of music and dance artists.

In 2022, it was the 40th anniversary of the signing of the twinning between the city of Guadalajara in Castilla-La Mancha (Spain) and the corresponding Guadalajara in Jalisco (Mexico). Likewise, the twinning of the city of Valladolid in Castile and León (Spain) with its counterpart Valladolid in Yucatán (Mexico) was established, so that both cities have been linked institutionally, promoting human contact and the cultural ties of each culture.

In February 2023, the twinning of the Sanctuaries dedicated to the Virgin of Guadalupe in Mexico and Spain was signed.

Drug trafficking
In 2012, four suspected members of Mexican drug cartel Sinaloa were arrested in Spain, while allegedly trying to set up a European operation.

In 2013, the head of the Spanish Drugs and Organized Crime Unit (known as Udyco) believed that the Mexican drug cartels had set out to “conquer” Spain and not forge an alliance with Colombian drug organizations.

In 2017, Spanish police extradited Juan Manuel Muñoz Luévano, suspected of carrying out operations for Mexican drugs cartel los Zetas in Spain, to the United States.

Trade relations 
In 1997, Mexico signed a Free Trade Agreement with the European Union, of which Spain is a member. In 2018, two-way trade between both nations amounted to US$10.8 billion. Mexico's exports to Spain include: crude oil, medicine, alcohol, fish and mobile phones; while Spanish exports to Mexico include: vehicles, vehicle parts and wine. Mexico is Spain's biggest trading partner in Latin America and 15th biggest globally

Several prominent Spanish multinational companies operate in Mexico, such as:  Banco Bilbao Vizcaya Argentaria, Mapfre, Santander Group, Telefónica and Zara; while several multinational Mexican companies operate in Spain, such as: ALFA, Cemex and Grupo Bimbo.

Resident diplomatic missions 
 Mexico has an embassy in Madrid and a consulate in Barcelona.
 Spain has an embassy in Mexico City and consulates-general in Guadalajara and Monterrey.

See also
 Centro Cultural de España en México
 Embassy of Mexico, Madrid
 Mexican immigration to Spain
 Spanish immigration to Mexico

References

External links
 Mexican Ministry of foreign Affairs on diplomatic relations between Mexico and Spain (in Spanish)
 Spanish Ministry of Foreign Affairs on bilateral relations with Mexico (in Spanish)

 
Spain
Bilateral relations of Spain
Relations of colonizer and former colony